A blues shouter is a blues singer, often male, capable of singing unamplified with a band.

Notable blues shouters include:
Piney Brown
Walter Brown, of the Jay McShann orchestra
H-Bomb Ferguson
Wynonie Harris
Screamin' Jay Hawkins
Duke Henderson, who operated mainly in the late 1940s and early 1950s.
Jimmy Rushing, blues shouter with Count Basie.
Big Joe Turner – his style hardly changed at all between 1938's "Roll 'Em Pete", and 1954's "Shake, Rattle and Roll". AllMusic called Turner "the premier blues shouter of the postwar era".
Eddie "Cleanhead" Vinson, an unusual combination of blues shouter and bebop alto saxophone player.
Big Joe Williams
Jimmy Witherspoon, who also appeared with Jay McShann.
Billy Wright
Howlin' Wolf (Chester Burnett)

References

Blues

Extended techniques